Tracey MacLeod (born 30 October 1960 in Ipswich, Suffolk) is an English journalist and broadcaster. She has presented arts and music programming, including The Late Show (1989–95) and its musical offshoots New West and Words and Music, Edinburgh Nights (1989, 1990), the Booker Prize (1990–95) and the Mercury Music Prize (1994–98). She hosted a Sunday night radio show on GLR from 1990 for several years, and was one of the launch DJs on BBC Radio 6 Music.

Biography 
MacLeod attended Ipswich High School and Durham University.

MacLeod worked as a researcher for the BBC before making her on-screen debut in 1987 on Channel 4’s youth show Network 7. Other screen credits include channel 4’s A Stab in the Dark with David Baddiel and Michael Gove, All I Want – A Portrait of Rufus Wainwright, Kitchen Criminals, Masterchef, and voicing over many music documentaries and the long-running BBC2 show Rapido, presented by Antoine de Caunes. She appeared as a guest interviewer in Sean Hughes' 1992 comedy series Sean's Show. Her friend Helen Fielding partly based the Jude character in Bridget Jones's Diary on her, and she appeared as an extra in the literary party scene of the film, directed by  Sharon Maguire.

She was a team captain on the Radio 4 music quiz All the Way from Memphis, with Andrew Collins, and a regular contestant on the Radio 4 books quiz, The Write Stuff.

She was the restaurant critic of The Independent from 1997 until the paper ended its print edition in 2016, winning the Glenfiddich Spirit of Scotland Award for "Restaurant Writer of the Year" in 2003, and being awarded "Restaurant Writer of the Year" by the Guild of Food Writers in 2008 and 2010. She has also been literary editor of Marie Claire, and radio critic of The Mail on Sunday.

She is a director of the talent agency KBJ Management, where she manages TV presenters including Simon Amstell and Kevin McCloud.

She is a regular guest critic on Masterchef.

References

External links

1960 births
Living people
British music journalists
The Independent people
Radio critics
British women journalists
20th-century English women writers
20th-century English writers
British food writers
British restaurant critics
Women food writers
Mass media people from Ipswich
Alumni of St Aidan's College, Durham